Marith Kristin Müller-Prießen (born 17 December 1990) is a German footballer. She currently plays for 1. FC Köln in the 2. Frauen-Bundesliga.

Honours

FCR 2001 Duisburg 
Bundesliga: Runner-up (3) 2006–07, 2007–08, 2009–10
German Cup: Winner (2) 2008–09, 2009–10, Runner-up (1) 2006–07
UEFA Women's Champions League: Winner (1) 2008–09
FIFA U-20 World Cup: Winner (1) 2010

1. FFC Frankfurt 
UEFA Women's Champions League: Winner (1) 2014–15

References

External links 
 
 

1990 births
Living people
German women's footballers
FCR 2001 Duisburg players
Bayer 04 Leverkusen (women) players
People from Viersen (district)
Sportspeople from Düsseldorf (region)
Frauen-Bundesliga players
Women's association football defenders
Footballers from North Rhine-Westphalia
1. FFC Frankfurt players
Paris FC (women) players
Division 1 Féminine players
Expatriate footballers in France
1. FC Köln (women) players